Carebara vidua is a species of ant in the subfamily Myrmicinae. It is currently listed as endangered because it is overly consumed for protein and used for medicine.

References

External links
 
 The ants of Africa

Myrmicinae
Insects described in 1858